Anurag Dikshit (born 1973) is an Indian businessman who, in connection with the online poker company PartyGaming, entered a guilty plea to one count of online gambling in violation of the Federal Wire Act and received a $300 million fine. He sold off the remainder of his stake in PartyGaming in January 2010, after selling 23% of his stake in the company's initial public offering, and a further two-thirds of the remainder, in October 2009.

He completed schooling at De Nobili School, FRI. Following graduation, Dikshit worked as a software developer in the United States at CMC, as a systems analyst for Websci and later as a consultant for AT&T.

PartyGaming
At age 26, Dikshit was asked by PartyGaming founder American Ruth Parasol to write the company's betting software.

In 2000, Dikshit hired a friend from his alma mater, Vikrant Bhargava, to begin working at PartyGaming with him and others. Party Poker was launched in August 2001.

Since online gambling is illegal in the US, the company's servers and offices were based in Gibraltar, where Dikshit settled.

In May 2006 Dikshit stepped down from PartyGaming's board of directors and took a position as head of the company's research and special projects.  As of December 2008 he still owned approximately 28% of the company's shares.

In December 2008, Dikshit entered a guilty plea to one count of online gambling in violation of the Federal Wire Act and agreed to forfeit $300 million. "I came to believe there was a high probability it was in violation of U.S. laws", Dikshit told U.S. District Judge Jed S. Rakoff in New York, referring to PartyGaming's activity. Dikshit no longer personally owns any shares in PartyGaming, having sold his shares in January 2010.

References

External links
Financial Times article

1973 births
Living people
People from Bihar
British businesspeople of Indian descent
Indian emigrants to the United Kingdom
IIT Delhi alumni
Date of birth missing (living people)
De Nobili Schools alumni
People from Dhanbad